Longitude 131° is a luxury resort located just outside the UNESCO World Heritage-listed Uluṟu-Kata Tjuṯa National Park, within  direct line of sight to Uluṟu, and a short driving distance of Yulara, in the Northern Territory, Australia.

Longitude 131° consists of 15 guest suites (tents) and the main communal Dune House which houses the lodges restaurant, bar, library, lounge areas and boutique and is designed in a tent-style with uninterrupted views of Uluṟu. It takes its name from its location on longitude 131°. Due to its remote location, Longitude 131° provides transfers to connect with all Ayers Rock Airport flights. Road access is via Yulara, located a short distance away; however, access to the resort is restricted to resort vehicles. Opened in June 2002 as part of Voyages Hotels & Resorts, Longitude 131° was acquired in 2013 by Baillie Lodges and is affiliated with the Luxury Lodges of Australia and Unique Lodges of the World.

2003 bushfires
The resort opened in 2002 and was devastated the following year by the 2003 bush fires. Fire damaged most of the tents as well as the resort clubhouse. The resort was extensively rebuilt and reopened. The new buildings used prefabricated structures and light-weight machinery which minimised impact on the delicate ecology; at the time, in a vital stage of regeneration.

Awards
The resorts unique location and design has won it a number of awards including the 2013 Trip Advisor Travellers’ Choice, the 2011 American Express Centurion Magazine Reader’s Choice Awards for Top Eco Friendly Resort and 2010 Travel+Leisure World’s Best Hotels Top 500, Australia & South Pacific Region.

See also

Yulara, Northern Territory

References

External links
Official website of Longitude 131°

Resorts in Australia
Tourist attractions in the Northern Territory
Philip Cox buildings